The 1995 Plymouth City Council election took place on 4 May 1995 to elect members of Plymouth City Council in Devon, England. This was on the same day as other local elections. The Labour Party retained control of the council, which it had gained from the Conservative Party at the previous election in 1991.

Overall results

|-
| colspan=2 style="text-align: right; margin-right: 1em" | Total
| style="text-align: right;" | 60
| colspan=5 |
| style="text-align: right;" | 74,617
| style="text-align: right;" |

Ward results

Budshead (3 seats)

Compton (3 seats)

Drake (3 seats)

Efford (3 seats)

Eggbuckland (3 seats)

Estover (3 seats)

Ham (3 seats)

Honicknowle (3 seats)

Keyham (3 seats)

Mount Gould (3 seats)

Plympton Erle (3 seats)

Plympton St Mary (3 seats)

Plymstock Dunstone (3 seats)

Plymstock Radford (3 seats)

Southway (3 seats)

St Budeax (3 seats)

St Peter (3 seats)

Stoke (3 seats)

Sutton (3 seats)

Trelawny (3 seats)

References

1995 English local elections
May 1995 events in the United Kingdom
1995
1990s in Devon